
Gmina Prażmów is a rural gmina (administrative district) in Piaseczno County, Masovian Voivodeship, in east-central Poland.

The gmina contains part of the protected area called Chojnów Landscape Park.

Villages
Gmina Prażmów contains the villages and settlements of Biały Ług, Błonie, Bronisławów, Chosna, Dobrzenica, Gabryelin, Jaroszowa Wola, Jeziórko, Kamionka, Kędzierówka, Kolonia Gościeńczyce, Koryta, Krępa, Krupia Wólka, Ławki, Łoś, Ludwików, Nowe Wągrodno, Nowy Prażmów, Piskórka, Prażmów, Ustanów, Uwieliny, Wągrodno, Wilcza Wólka, Wola Prażmowska, Wola Wągrodzka, Zadębie and Zawodne.

Neighbouring gminas
Gmina Prażmów is bordered by the gminas of Chynów, Góra Kalwaria, Grójec, Piaseczno and Tarczyn.

References
Polish official population figures 2006

Prazmow
Piaseczno County